The Le Locle–Les Brenets line is a  railway line in the canton of Neuchâtel in Switzerland. Today, it is operated by the Transports publics Neuchâtelois. On 24 July 2020 , the canton of Neuchâtel announced the line will closed in 2025, to be replaced by an electric bus service that will use the 	Petits-Monts railway tunnel.

References

External links 
 
 Les Brenets - Le Locle timetable 

Metre gauge railways in Switzerland
Railway lines opened in 1890
1890 establishments in Switzerland